Dudley is a ghost town in Wapello County, Iowa, United States. Both 1908 and 1920 surveys of northwestern Wapello County show a post office at Dudley. A sign on the former edge of town reads: "Population 12 and God only knows how many dogs and cats."

History
 Dudley's population was 55 in 1902, and 64 in 1925.

Dudley's population was 64 in 1940.

References

Ghost towns in Iowa
Geography of Wapello County, Iowa